Group A of the 1995 Fed Cup Asia/Oceania Zone Group II was one of two pools in the Asia/Oceania Zone Group I of the 1995 Fed Cup. Four teams competed in a round robin competition, with the top two teams advancing to the knockout stage and the bottom team being relegated down to Group II for 1996.

Singapore vs. Syria

Uzbekistan vs. Singapore

Uzbekistan vs. Syria

See also
Fed Cup structure

References

External links
 Fed Cup website

1995 Fed Cup Asia/Oceania Zone